"Stop the Cavalry" is an anti-war song written and performed by English musician Jona Lewie, released in 1980. The song peaked at number three on the UK Singles Chart in December 1980, at one point being kept from number one by two re-issued songs by John Lennon, who had been murdered on 8 December that year. Initially a stand-alone single, the song was included on Lewie's album Heart Skips Beat which was released nearly two years later.

Background and composition
Lewie wrote the song while living at home with his parents. He told PRS for Music, "I was playing about on my grandmother's piano and came up with a particular refrain I liked and kept coming back to. A little germ of an idea had been planted in my head, but one that didn't come fully into fruition for about the next five months. The first lyrics I thought of were actually 'can you stop the gallantry', about the gallant soldiers of the Crimean War and especially the charge of the Light Brigade. This later became Stop the Cavalry and I widened the perspective of the song to be about all wars and all soldiers." He would later use an eight-track recorder to improve the song which was then taken up by Dave Robinson at Stiff Records. After Lewie signed to Stiff Records, founder Dave Robinson dismissed the demo as "just another antiwar song", but after rearrangement – and Lewie playing the now iconic refrain on a kazoo – it proved a hit with Robinson. A Salvation Army brass band was then recruited to play the main melody. "The song actually had nothing to do with Christmas when I wrote it," Lewie told the Daily Express in 2005. "There is one line about [the soldier] being on the front and missing his girlfriend: 'I wish I was at home for Christmas.' The record company picked up on that from a marketing perspective, and added a tubular bell."

The lyrics of the song mention cavalry and Winston Churchill (who served as the First Lord of the Admiralty in the first year of the First World War, prior to serving in the trenches himself), but it breaks with the First World War theme with references to nuclear fallout and the line "I have had to fight, almost every night, down throughout these centuries". Lewie described the song's soldier as being "a bit like the eternal soldier at the Arc de Triomphe". At the time of the song's release there was an increase in tension between the Western Bloc and the Eastern Bloc, with American-controlled nuclear cruise missiles being stationed in the UK and a renewed fear of nuclear war, which was referenced in the lyrical mention of the fallout zone.

Music video
The song's music video was filmed in Hampstead Heath in London. It is set in the trenches of the First World War, while also featuring Lewie and the Salvation Army brass band walking through the streets.

Legacy
In an interview for Channel 4's 100 Greatest Christmas Moments, Lewie said that the song was never intended as a Christmas hit, and that it was a protest song. Indeed, some overseas releases (for example, in South Africa and New Zealand) were in the spring rather than at Christmas. The line "Wish I was at home for Christmas", as well as the brass band arrangements made it an appropriately styled song to play around Christmas time. Lewie had said that royalties received from the song account for 50 per cent of his income stream.

According to a 2017 poll conducted by The Irish Times, "Stop the Cavalry" is the fourth most popular Christmas song in Ireland.

In 2022, it was reported that the song was listed as the seventh highest royalty earning Christmas song.

Charts

Certifications

See also
 List of anti-war songs

References

1980 songs
1980 singles
Jona Lewie songs
Anti-war songs
British Christmas songs
Number-one singles in Austria
Number-one singles in France
Songs about soldiers
Songs about the military
Songs about World War I
Songs written by Jona Lewie
Stiff Records singles